Johnny Brown may refer to:
Johnny Brown (Scottish boxer) (1901–1961), Scottish boxer, former British welterweight champion
Johnny Brown (English boxer) (1902–1976), English boxer
Johnny Mack Brown (1904–1974), American college football player and film actor
Texas Johnny Brown (1928–2013), American blues guitarist, songwriter and singer
Johnny Brown (actor) (1937–2022), American actor and singer
Johnny Brown (rugby league) (born 1943), Australian rugby league player
Johnny Brown (basketball) (born 1963), American basketball player and coach
Johnny Brown, character in the Australian TV series Neighbours
Johny Brown, singer with The Band of Holy Joy

See also
John Brown (disambiguation)